Erki Pütsep (born 25 May 1976 in Jõgeva) is an Estonian professional road bicycle racer who last rode for the  team. He is the three time national road race champion (2004, 2006 and 2007) and won the E.O.S. Tallinn GP in 2007. In 2011 he won Baltic Chain Tour, which was held in Lithuania, Latvia and Estonia.

Major results 

2001
 2nd Classic Loire Atlantique
2002
 1st Stage 2 Tour de Corrèze
 2nd Bordeaux-Saintes
 3rd Tallinn GP
 6th Classic Loire Atlantique
 9th Tartu GP
2003
 3rd National Road Race Championships
 7th Tartu GP
2004
 1st  National Road Race Championships
 1st Classic Loire Atlantique
 8th Tro-Bro Léon
 10th Tartu GP
 10th EOS Tallinn GP
2005
 1st Overall Tour de la Somme
1st Stage 1
 2nd EOS Tallinn GP
 2nd National Road Race Championships
 2nd Duo Normand (with Yuriy Krivtsov)
 9th Tartu GP
 10th Cholet-Pays de Loire
2006
 1st  National Road Race Championships
 4th GP de Denain
 6th Cholet-Pays de Loire
 8th Gent–Wevelgem
 10th Route Adélie
2007
 1st  National Road Race Championships
 1st EOS Tallinn GP
 1st Ühispanga Tartu GP
2008
 2nd Tallinn–Tartu GP
 2nd Riga Grand Prix
 3rd Tartu GP
 3rd National Road Race Championships
2009
 1st Tallinn–Tartu GP
 3rd National Road Race Championships
 3rd Grand Prix de la Ville de Nogent-sur-Oise
 6th Classic Loire Atlantique
2010
 3rd Tallinn–Tartu GP
 3rd Mémorial Danny Jonckheere
2011
 1st Overall Baltic Chain Tour
 7th Tallinn–Tartu GP
 9th Scandinavian Race Uppsala
2012
 2nd Riga Grand Prix
 4th Tour of Vojvodina II
 5th Tartu GP
 6th Tour of Vojvodina I
 8th  Central European Tour Budapest GP

References

External links 

Profile at Bouygues Télécom official website

1976 births
Living people
Sportspeople from Jõgeva
Estonian male cyclists
Cyclists at the 2000 Summer Olympics
Cyclists at the 2004 Summer Olympics
Olympic cyclists of Estonia